Foot & Ankle Specialist is a bimonthly peer-reviewed medical journal that covers the field of orthopedics. The editors-in-chief are Gregory C. Berlet and Lowell Weil, Jr. (Weil Foot & Ankle Institute). It was established in 2008 and is currently published by SAGE Publications.

Abstracting and indexing 
Foot & Ankle Specialist is abstracted and indexed in PubMed, Medline, EMBASE, and Scopus.

External links 
 

SAGE Publishing academic journals
English-language journals
Orthopedics journals
Bimonthly journals
Publications established in 2008